This is a list of gliders/sailplanes of the world, (this reference lists all gliders with references, where available) 
Note: Any aircraft can glide for a short time, but gliders are designed to glide for longer.

Italian miscellaneous constructors 
 Abate GP-1 – ABATE, U.
 AER Pegaso M 100S
 Aeromere M-100
 Alfieri AT-1 Alcyone – A.Alfieri
 ASUP 1924 glider
 Avia LM-02

 Bagalini Bagaliante
 Bertelli Aerostave	1905	Italie	BERTELLI, Achille
 Borghese 1931 hyydroglider
 Bottini Mabo
 Bruni 3V-1 Eolo
 Busso San Giorgio
 Cambilargiu Goliardia - Emanuele Cambilargiu
 Caproni Vizzola Calif
 CPV-1 Arlecchino – Centro Politecnico del Volo
 Danieli Piuma 
 Ditta Movo F.M.1 Passero – Frati designed
 Febo Paglierini – Fabris
 Frati BF-46 – Stelio Frati – Aeroclub de Busto Arsizio, Varese
 Glasfaser Velino – Glasfaser Italiana SpA
 IMAM Ro-35 
 Lombardi AL-12P – Aeronautica Lombardi
 Macetti Aeronautilo – A.M. Macetti
 Meteor MS-30 L-Passero 
 Pagliani Vittoria – Pagiani, Armando
 Piernifero
 Posniak propulsione umana – Posniak, B, – man-powered aircraft
 Raciti Grifone – Racitti, A.
 Sala N-1 
 Silva AL-3 – Silva, C. – Aeronautica Lombarda
 Tedeschi E.T.186
 Zögling biposto – Albini, Cella, Facciolo, Moltrasio
 Zannier Friuli – Zannier, Ugo

Notes

Further reading

External links

Lists of glider aircraft